The women's 100 metres event at the 1985 Summer Universiade was held at the Kobe Universiade Memorial Stadium in Kobe on 29 and 30 August 1985.

Medalists

Results

Heats
Held on 29 August

Wind:Heat 2: -0.2 m/s

Semifinals
Held on 30 August

Final
Held on 30 August

Wind: 0.0 m/s

References

Athletics at the 1985 Summer Universiade
1985